Schimmert is a village in the Dutch province of Limburg. It is located in the municipality of Beekdaelen.

History 
The village was first mentioned in the mid-11th century as "de Scinmottera". The etymology is unclear.

The Catholic St Remigius Church is a three-aisled church from irregular blocks of chalk which was constructed between 1924 and 1926 after a design by Pierre Cuypers and Joseph Cuypers. The tower was damaged during World War II and repaired in 1956. 

The water tower was built between 1926 and 1927 on the highest point of the plateau in Expressionist style. The tower measures . In 1935, matching worker's houses were added.

Schimmert was home to 215 people in 1840. Schimmert was a separate municipality until 1982, when it was merged with Nuth. In 2019, it became part of Beekdaelen.

Gallery

Notable people
 Pieter Eijssen, Dutch lawyer (1906–1988)
 Wim Ernes, equestrian dressage coach (1958–2016)
 Charles Eyck, visual artist (1897–1983)
 Otto Hermans, politician (born 1950)
 , Bishop of Roermond (1884–1960)
 Jean-Nicolas Lemmens, Bishop of Victoria, Vancouver Island, Canada
 , Bishop of Giufi, Metropolitan bishop of Blantyre, Archbishop of Bavagaliana and Skálholt (1905–1979)

References

External links

Populated places in Limburg (Netherlands)
Former municipalities of Limburg (Netherlands)
Beekdaelen